The 2009 FIFA Beach Soccer World Cup was the fifth edition of the FIFA Beach Soccer World Cup, governed by FIFA. Overall, this was the 15th edition of a world cup in beach soccer since the establishment of the Beach Soccer World Championships which ran from 1995–2004 but was not governed by FIFA. It took place in Dubai, the United Arab Emirates between 16 November and 22 November 2009. It was the second tournament to take place outside Brazil, first to be played in Asia, and the last tournament to take place on an annual basis.

The winners of the tournament were Brazil, who won their fourth consecutive FIFA Beach Soccer World Cup title and their thirteenth title overall.

Qualifying rounds

African Zone 

The qualifiers to determine the two African nations who would play in the World Cup took place in Durban, South Africa for the fourth year running between 1 July and 5 July. Nine nations took part in the competition, which eventually saw Nigeria claim their second title, qualifying for the first time since 2007, with the Ivory Coast finishing in second place, qualifying for the first time.

Asian Zone 

The Asian qualifiers were held in Dubai, the United Arab Emirates, from 7 to 11 November. With only seven teams attending the qualifiers, the United Arab Emirates stepped in as the eighth side to even the two groups in the group stage. Japan qualified for the fourth time after beating Bahrain in the final of the championship, who qualified for their second World Cup.

European Zone 

UEFA held the second European tournament dedicated to World Cup qualification in Castellón, Spain, between, 7 June and 14 June. Hosts Spain won the championship, with Russia finishing second. Switzerland beat Portugal in the third place play off, but regardless of the result, both teams qualified to the World Cup, along with the finalists. Italy beat France in the fifth place play off to qualify as the fifth European nation.

North, Central American and Caribbean Zone 

The North, Central America and the Caribbean Zone qualifiers took place between 17 June and 21 June, after being postponed in May due to the 2009 swine flu pandemic, in Puerto Vallarta, Mexico, for the second year running. El Salvador and Costa Rica were the two finalists, meaning they both qualified for the World Cup; El Salvador for the second time and Costa Rica for the first. El Salvador defeated Costa Rica in the final to win their first title.

Oceanian Zone 

The qualifiers to decide the one nation from Oceania that would be competing in the World Cup took place in Moorea, Tahiti, between 27 July and 31 July. Despite Vanuatu winning the group stage, they lost in the final to the Solomon Islands, who claimed their third title and qualification for a fourth year in a row.

South American Zone 

The South American qualifiers took place between 11 March and 15 March, in the Uruguayan capital, Montevideo. Brazil and hosts Uruguay were the two finalists, meaning they both qualified for the World Cup. Brazil defeated Uruguay in the final to win the title. Argentina and Ecuador were knocked out in the semi finals and played each other in the third place play off. Argentina beat Ecuador to claim the third berth at the World Cup.

Host 
United Arab Emirates qualified automatically as the hosts.

Teams 
These are the teams that qualified for the World Cup:

Asian zone:
 
 
  (hosts)

African zone:
  (first appearance)
 

European zone:
 
 
 
 
 

North, Central American and Caribbean zone:
  (first appearance)
 

Oceanian zone:
 

South American zone:

Players

Venues 
Two venues were used in the city of Dubai, United Arab Emirates at Jumeirah Beach during the World Cup with matches split between them as follows.

Groups 
The 16 teams present at the finals in Brazil were split into 4 groups of 4 teams. Each team played the other 3 teams in its group in a round-robin format, with the top two teams advancing to the quarter finals. The quarter finals, semi finals and the final itself was played in the form of a knockout tournament.

All matches are listed as local time in Dubai, (UTC+4)

Group A 

 Uruguay and Portugal are ranked based on their head-to-head result.

Group B

Group C 

 Italy and Argentina are ranked based on their head-to-head result.

Group D

Knockout stage

Quarter finals

Semi-finals

Third-place play-off

Final

Winners

Awards

Top scorers

Final standings

References

External links 
 FIFA Beach Soccer World Cup Dubai 2009 , FIFA.com
 FIFA Beach Soccer World Cup Dubai 2009 , Beach Soccer Worldwide
 FIFA Technical Report

 
2009
Beach
2009 in beach soccer
2009